Actinoplanes lutulentus is a bacterium in the genus Actinoplanes which has been isolated from mucky soil collected from Jinlong Mountain, in Harbin, Heilongjiang Province, China.

References 

Micromonosporaceae
Bacteria described in 2014